The Sheds were an American ska punk band from Agoura Hills, California, active from 2005 to 2015.

History
The Sheds released their first EP in 2011 titled ...And Now for Something Completely Different. The Sheds released their second EP titled Self/Doubt in 2012 via Mediaskare Records. The sheds released their first and only full-length album titled I'll Be Fine in 2013 via Mediaskare Records. The album was produced by Nicky Zinner.The song "Bad Things Are Bad" was featured on the Tony Hawk's Pro Skater 5 soundtrack in 2015.

Member
 Mac Miller : lead vocals, guitar
 Trey Hales : guitar, backing vocals
 Jonathan McMaster : bass, screamo vocals
 Morgan Miller : second guitar
 Mark Blaker : drums

Discography
Studio albums
I'll Be Fine (2013, Mediaskare)
EPs
Self/Doubt (2012, Mediaskare)
...And Now for Something Completely Different (2011, Mediaskare)

References

American ska musical groups
American ska punk musical groups
Musical groups established in 2005
Musical groups disestablished in 2015